Leon Christoph Goretzka (born 6 February 1995) is a German professional footballer who plays as a midfielder for  club Bayern Munich and the Germany national team. Due to his defensive prowess and passing range, Goretzka is widely considered one of the world's best box-to-box midfielders. 

Starting off his career with VfL Bochum in 2012, he went on play more than 100 Bundesliga games for Schalke 04 before signing with Bayern Munich in 2018. A full international since 2014, he has won more than 40 caps for the German national team and represented his country at the 2017 FIFA Confederations Cup, the 2018 FIFA World Cup, and UEFA Euro 2020. He was also a part of the Germany Olympic team that finished second at the 2016 Summer Olympics.

Club career

VfL Bochum
In 1999, Goretzka started his career with Werner SV 06 Bochum. He stayed for two years with the WSV before making the move to VfL Bochum in 2001.
	
On 30 July 2012, Goretzka was awarded the 2012 under-17 Fritz Walter Medal in gold. On 4 August 2012, he made his professional debut for Bochum in the 2. Bundesliga against Dynamo Dresden in the rewirpowerSTADION.

Goretzka had an impressive 2012–13 season at Bochum and was their standout performer as Bochum narrowly avoided relegation from the 2. Bundesliga. During the season, Goretzka was linked to several big clubs around Europe including Bayern Munich, Manchester United, Arsenal and Real Madrid. Matthias Sammer, the then sporting director of Bayern Munich, reportedly met with Goretzka to try to convince him of joining Bayern in the summer of 2013.

Schalke 04
On 30 June 2013, Schalke 04 confirmed the transfer of Goretzka from Bochum. He signed a five-year contract until 30 June 2018. The transfer fee was reported to be €3.250 million.

2013–14 season

During the 2013–14 season, Goretzka had a promising first season, scoring five goals in 32 appearances in all competitions. He became a regular starter in the second half of the season and helped Schalke finish in third place in the Bundesliga behind champions Bayern Munich and Borussia Dortmund. At the end of the season, Goretzka was called up for the 30-man preliminary squad of the Germany national team for the 2014 FIFA World Cup in Brazil. He made his debut in a friendly match against Poland prior to the World Cup.

2014–15 season
During the 2014–15 season, Goretzka was limited to only 11 matches in all competitions due to a thigh injury. He returned from the injury on Matchday 24 against TSG 1899 Hoffenheim. Goretzka played in only 10 Bundesliga matches during the season. Schalke had a disappointing season and finished in sixth place in the Bundesliga.

2015–16 season

During the 2015–16 season, Goretzka scored two goals in 34 appearances in all competitions. He was back to full fitness at the start of the season, but had several injuries throughout the season. Goretzka was also diagnosed with an inflammatory bowel disease during the season and said "I was diagnosed with a chronic bowel inflammation, which had been having a negative impact on my ability to recover." Goretzka continued: "So I completely changed what I eat, cutting out gluten, cow's milk, pork and nuts. As a result, I have fewer issues with my health and I can recover from a game much quicker.

2016–17 season
During the 2016–17 season, Goretzka played in a career-high 41 matches in all competitions, scoring eight goals. This was regarded as Goretzka's best season to date as he flourished in a more attacking role. On 20 April, Goretzka received a concussion and suffered a double fracture of his jaw while playing against Ajax in the Europa League. He continued and played almost the entire match until he was substituted in the 84th minute. Schalke finished in a disappointing 10th place in the Bundesliga and did not qualify for European places.

2017–18 season
During the 2017–18 season, Goretzka played in 29 matches in all competitions and scored four goals. This was his first season without European football since his arrival at Schalke in 2013. He had problems with stress reaction in bones in his lower leg, which kept him out of action for over two months. Goretzka helped Schalke finish second behind champions Bayern Munich to qualify for the UEFA Champions League for the first time since the 2014–15 season. On 25 November 2017, he played in his 100th Bundesliga game in a match against Schalke's bitter rivals, Borussia Dortmund. On 19 January 2018, Goretzka announced that he would leave Schalke in the summer of 2018 and join rivals Bayern Munich. His decision did not go down well with the Schalke fans and board. Schalke's supervisory board chairman, Clemens Tönnies, expressed his first reaction regarding Goretzka's decision on a football talk show. Tönnies said: "My first reaction was, that you shouldn’t wear the jersey of Schalke anymore." Tönnies said that Goretzka could be forced to sit in the stands should his decision have a negative impact on the team.

Bayern Munich

2018–19 season

On 1 July 2018, Goretzka officially joined Bayern by signing a four-year contract until June 2022. On 12 August 2018, in the DFL Super Cup, he came on for Thomas Müller in the 64th minute. This was Goretzka's first appearance for Bayern. On 1 September, he scored his first goal for the club in a 3–0 away victory over VfB Stuttgart. The following year, on 19 January 2019, he scored his first ever brace in the Bundesliga, scoring twice in a 3–1 win over Hoffenheim. On 15 February 2019, Goretzka scored an own goal in a Bundesliga game after 13 seconds; no Bayern player had yet touched the ball.

On 18 May 2019, Goretzka won his first Bundesliga title as Bayern finished two points above Dortmund with 78 points. A week later, he won his first DFB-Pokal as Bayern defeated RB Leipzig 3–0 in the 2019 DFB-Pokal Final. He did not appear in the match as he was out injured.

2019–20 season
On 26 November 2019, Goretzka scored his first Champions League goal during a 6–0 away win at Red Star Belgrade. He played vital part of Bayern's treble win under Hansi Flick. He played most of the games, including the whole Champions League campaign, making a midfield duo with Joshua Kimmich. After Benjamin Pavard got injured and Kimmich was asked to play as a right-back, Goretzka played in a box-to-box midfielder role next to Thiago, including in the Champions League final.

2020–21 season
On 24 September 2020, Goretzka scored a goal in a 2–1 win over Sevilla after extra time in the 2020 UEFA Super Cup. In April 2021, he missed the second leg against Paris Saint-Germain in the Champions League quarter-finals due to muscle problems. However, he ended the season winning his third consecutive Bundesliga title.

2021–22 season 
Ahead of the season, Goretzka was assigned the number 8 shirt left vacant by Javi Martínez. On 17 August 2021, Goretzka conquered the 2021 DFL-Super Cup with Bayern, playing the full 90 minutes. On 16 September, Bayern announced that Goretzka had signed a new contract, keeping him at the club until 2026.

2022–23 season
On 12 October 2022, he scored a brace in a 4–2 away win over Viktoria Plzeň, in which Bayern secured their qualification to the Champions League knockout phase.

International career

Youth
On 15 October 2010, Goretzka made his Germany national U-16 football team debut in a friendly against Northern Ireland. He scored in the 3–2 victory. On 24 August 2011, he made his Germany national U-17 football team debut against Turkey in a 4–0 victory. In May 2012, he captained the Germany national U-17 football team at the 2012 UEFA European Under-17 Championship in Slovenia and led the German U-17 team all the way to the final against the Netherlands. In the final, Goretzka scored the first goal of the match; his goal was compensated in stoppage time, taking the scoreline to 1–1. The subsequent penalty shoot-out was won by the Netherlands. On 8 August 2013, he debuted for the Germany national U-21 football team under Horst Hrubesch in a 0–0 draw against France, in which he had a magnificent match.

Goretzka was contacted by the Polish national team but rejected the offer as he is not aware of any Polish background.

Senior
On 8 May 2014, Goretzka was included in the 30-men preliminary squad of the German national team for the 2014 FIFA World Cup by Germany's manager, Joachim Löw. On 13 May 2014, he made his debut in a 0–0 draw against Poland. After Germany's match against Poland, in which Goretzka had suffered a muscle injury, he was removed from the team's preparatory training camp and final squad for the 2014 World Cup in Brazil.

In May 2017, Goretzka was named in Germany's squad for the Confederations Cup in Russia.
In the nation's opening match for the tournament on 20 June, he scored his first goal for Germany in a 3–2 Group B win over Australia. Goretzka scored two goals against Mexico in the semi-finals. Goretzka finished joint top scorer with Timo Werner and Lars Stindl in the competition with three goals. The German national team won the competition, beating Chile in the final in Saint Petersburg.

On 4 June 2018, Goretzka was included in Germany's final 23-man squad for the 2018 FIFA World Cup. On 27 June, he made his World Cup debut in the last match of the group stage in a 2–0 defeat to South Korea as his side got knocked out from the World Cup in the first round for the first time since 1938. On 19 May 2021, he was selected to the squad for the UEFA Euro 2020. He scored a goal in the final group fixture, a 2–2 draw against Hungary which saved Germany from elimination.

Olympic team
Alongside Schalke teammate Max Meyer, Goretzka was named in the squad for the 2016 Summer Olympics. He captained Germany in their first match against Mexico, but picked up a shoulder injury, and returned to Gelsenkirchen.

Playing style
In 2013, Goretzka was referred to as one of the brightest talents in German football. Peter Neururer, Goretzka's head coach at Bochum, said that he had "never seen an eighteen year old footballer which had a potential as Goretzka", and titled him as the "talent of the century". Goretzka has a potent eye for scoring goals and is known to possess good ball control ability and also has the ability to pick out passes for his teammates. He produces powerful shots from outside the penalty area. He is also well known for his excellent heading ability which sees him regularly score goals with his head. At 1.89 m, Goretzka's high-jumping ability helps him to win aerial battles against strong and tall defenders. His main position is as a central midfielder, although he can be deployed as a defensive midfielder, a right winger and a playmaker. Goretzka's game has often been compared to two of Germany's footballing greats, Lothar Matthäus and Michael Ballack.

Personal life
Goretzka was born in Bochum, North Rhine-Westphalia. His father, Konrad, is an automotive engineer and electrical engineer for Opel. His mother, Katharina, was presbyter in the Protestant parish of Altenbochum-Laer and worked as a business manager in many institutions in Bochum.

Goretzka launched an online initiative, "We Kick Corona", with his Bayern Munich teammate Joshua Kimmich, to help charitable, social or medical institutions during the COVID-19 pandemic.

Goretzka has been an activist against hate crimes, visiting the Dachau Holocaust memorial, and meeting Holocaust survivor Margot Friedländer. He is a critic of the far-right political party Alternative for Germany, calling them a "disgrace for Germany" and saying "when a party is supported and led by Holocaust revisionists and Corona deniers, then they are unmasking themselves".

Beside football, Goretzka has also primarily invested in a marketing company in 2014, in August 2020 Goretzka started his business in real estate, LivinCG inmobilien GMBH, which is managed by his girlfriend.

Career statistics

Club

International

As of match played 11 November 2021. Germany score listed first, score column indicates score after each Goretzka goal.

Honours
Bayern Munich
 Bundesliga: 2018–19, 2019–20, 2020–21, 2021–22
 DFB-Pokal: 2018–19, 2019–20
 DFL-Supercup: 2018, 2020, 2021
 UEFA Champions League: 2019–20
 UEFA Super Cup: 2020
 FIFA Club World Cup: 2020

Germany U17
 UEFA European Under-17 Championship runner-up: 2012

Germany Olympic
 Summer Olympic Games silver medal: 2016

Germany
 FIFA Confederations Cup: 2017

Individual
 Fritz Walter Medal U17 Gold: 2012
 FIFA Confederations Cup Silver Boot: 2017 
 FIFA Confederations Cup Bronze Ball: 2017
 UEFA Champions League Squad of the Season: 2019–20
 Bundesliga Team of the Season: 2017–18, 2020–21
kicker Bundesliga Team of the Season: 2020–21
VDV Bundesliga Team of the Season: 2020–21

References

External links

Profile at the FC Bayern Munich website

kicker profile

1995 births
Living people
Sportspeople from Bochum
Footballers from North Rhine-Westphalia
German footballers
Association football midfielders
VfL Bochum players
FC Schalke 04 players
FC Schalke 04 II players
FC Bayern Munich footballers
2. Bundesliga players
Bundesliga players
Regionalliga players
UEFA Champions League winning players
Germany youth international footballers
Germany under-21 international footballers
Germany international footballers
2017 FIFA Confederations Cup players
2018 FIFA World Cup players
UEFA Euro 2020 players
2022 FIFA World Cup players
FIFA Confederations Cup-winning players
Olympic footballers of Germany
Footballers at the 2016 Summer Olympics
Medalists at the 2016 Summer Olympics
Olympic silver medalists for Germany
Olympic medalists in football